Sandberg is the name of a post office and small surrounding community that was attached to The Sandberg Lodge (originally Sandberg's Summit Hotel), located on the Ridge Route highway in the Sierra Pelona Mountains of Southern California. The Ridge Route linked the Greater Los Angeles area to the San Joaquin Valley and Central California from 1919 through 1933.

The lodge was destroyed by a fire in 1961, but the site lives on as a dot on northwestern Los Angeles County maps. Sandberg was later the site of a U.S. weather station.

Geography
It is  via Interstate 5 to Downtown Los Angeles. Sandberg is classed as a populated place by the United States Geological Survey, which means it is "a place or area with clustered or scattered buildings and a permanent human population."

Climate

History

The Sandbergs

Harald Sandberg, a native of Norway, settled in the Antelope Valley with his brother, Albert, in 1882, and they developed large areas there. On April 2, 1897, Harald filed homestead papers on ranch property just north of the parcel that later housed his hotel and inn.

In December 1900 the brothers made news when they " captured a very large specimen of the California condor on their mountain ranch at Neenach, near Newhall, last Saturday."

" The bird had gorged itself on a dead cow until unable to fly, and will now have to pay for being a blutton [sic] by a term of captivity. . . . The specimen captured measures about twelve feet from tip to tip of wing. . . . Few specimens of this condor have ever been captured, and this is regarded as a prize. If brought to the city it will probably be put in the park menagerie."

Harald built his lodge in 1914, just one year before the opening of the Ridge Route resulted in a parade of cars by his front door, seven days a week. "Sandberg's lodge at the top of the grade was a welcome sight to weary [Los Angeles] motorists still only halfway to Bakersfield," the Los Angeles Times reported. A hotel, restaurant, and cabins were constructed on leased Forest Service land immediately to the south of the homesteaded property.

When first opened in a one-story building, the business was named Sandberg's Summit Hotel. Some time after 1921 the owner turned it into a three-story log hostelry set amid a grove of California live oaks. A crank telephone provided access to the outside world via the long-distance phone circuits that connected Los Angeles with Bakersfield. Cabins also provided lodging behind the hotel.

In 1918, Harald Sandberg was appointed postmaster of the settlement, which was thenceforth named Sandberg, with the post office inside the hotel itself.

"It was a small tourist community," Bakersfield resident Frank Kaufman told Interviewer Harrison Irving Scott (author of a history of the Ridge Route); it had a repair garage that advertised "Labor $2, after 6 p.m. $3; never closed." Motor Stages would stop at Sandberg's for meals, and motorists would hunger for Mrs. (Marion) Sandberg's apple pie.

In September 1929, attorney and real estate developer Ulysses S. Grant Jr., the son of the 18th American president, checked into Sandberg's with his wife and nephew for a visit. He died of a heart attack in his room.

In spring 1934, the lodge was put up for sale. A newspaper classified advertisement described it:

" RESORT SANITARIUM DUDE RANCH SANDBERG'S INN. RIDGE ROUTE. 75 mi. from L.A. by highway. Ideal climate: natural beauty. 100 A. of tree covered level & rolling land. Secluded & quiet. 3-story bldg. with lobby, dining rm., hotel rms., etc. 7 other bldgs. Accommodate 35 guests. Own elec. & water plants. Fully equipt. & furn. to operate now. Sell or TRADE. Phone CRestview 7644 or Box M-285, Times."

Sandberg died on July 9, 1939, and his wife on April 1, 1954.

Interregnum
By the time of Harald Sandberg's death, there were new operators for the place, a newspaper advertisement having proclaimed:
" Grand Opening and Free Barbecue Sunday, May 28, 1939. Sandberg Lodge and Dude Ranch, Larry Brock  proprietor, Harry Moss Manager."

But the hotel never regained its former popularity: An alternate to the Ridge Route was opened, an event that virtually stopped traffic through Sandberg. Nevertheless, J.H. Cox purchased both the lodge and the ranch and, according to Walter W. (Lucky) Stevens, a later owner, Cox tainted the hotel's  reputation by allegedly "bringing in booze, slot machines and 'ladies of the night.' " Cox sold the operation to Lillian Grojean, who turned the hotel garage into a ceramics factory; her lease from the Forest Service amounted to $90 a year.

Lucky Stevens
Lucky Stevens, a sometime film actor, was running a ceramics business in Burbank when he met Grojean. In 1950 or 1951 he paid her $15,000 for the dilapidated hotel, outbuildings, and lease.

At first he had plans to install a swimming pool and a fishing pond and to reopen the property as a guest ranch. By that time, the lodge was in disrepair, with pigeons roosting among the rafters.

On April 29, 1961, fire destroyed the main lodge. Stevens was alone in the building. A district forest ranger said the blaze was apparently started by sparks from the chimney, and Stevens told an interviewer later that he had been burning trash when the flames began.

The Forest Service canceled Stevens' lease in 1963, and nothing remains on the site today but a historic marker, some stone steps, a bit of foundation, trees, and shrubbery.

Weather observation and fire station

A four-man weather station was established in 1933 at the windy peak of nearby Bald Mountain, which straddles the boundary between the maritime climate to the south and a drier climate to the north. In 1953, the weather observers had to visually check the instruments and manually transmit the information via Teletype.

In 1978, the Weather Service switched to an automated station, explaining, in the words of Los Angeles Times staff writer Marika Gerrard,  that "It was just too hard to find someone to live up in that remote region with nothing to do but record weather statistics every hour on  the hour." Nevertheless, in May 1981 reporter Gerrard found two people living at the station — a college student-caretaker and a man experimenting with the prototype of  a modular wind turbine.

The other two people living in Sandberg in that month were Willard Sparks, captain of the Quail Lake Fire Station, and his wife, Shirley. Sparks was responsible for covering  of forested land that included Sandberg, Gorman, Pyramid Lake, part of the Angeles Forest, and a stretch of Interstate 5 known as "Blood Alley" because of the frequent accidents there.

References

External links
 Ridgeroute.com, "the website dedicated to that curvy little road that united California."

Unincorporated communities in Los Angeles County, California
Sierra Pelona Ridge
Unincorporated communities in California